York South was a provincial electoral district for the Legislative Assembly of New Brunswick, Canada. It was formed in 1974 when the former multi-member electoral district of York County was split into York North and York South. In the electoral redistribution of 1994, York South ceased to exist when it was divided between the new electoral districts of York and New Maryland and the existing districts of Fredericton South and Woodstock.

Members of the Legislative Assembly

Election results

External links
Website of the Legislative Assembly of New Brunswick

Former provincial electoral districts of New Brunswick